Samu Heikkilä (born 31 July 1971 in Karstula) is a Finnish film editor.

Education
He graduated from University of Art and Design Helsinki with Master of Arts in Cinema in 1999.

Career
He has won film editing awards for films such as Restless and Frozen Land. In his career he has won six awards and received nine nominations. In 2005 he was granted the State Prize for Cinema along with director Aku Louhimies and cinematographer Rauno Ronkainen. In 2019 he received the Nordisk Film Prize in Finland along with director Aleksi Salmenperä.

Filmography
Tove (2020) 
Games People Play (2020)
White Wall (2020) TV Series
Maria's Paradise (2019)
The Human Part (2018)
Void (2018)
The Violin Player (2018)
Miami (2017) 
The Other Side of Hope (2017)
Little Wing (2016) 
The Mine (2016) 
Distractions (2015)
Other Girls (2015)
Dagmamman (2014) 
8-Ball (2013) 
Alcan Highway (2013) Documentary
Leap (2012) Documentary
Five Star Existence (2012) Documentary
Forever Yours (2011) Documentary
Bad Family (2010)
A Man from the Congo River (2009) Documentary
Letters To Father Jacob (2009)
Punksters & Youngsters (2008) Documentary
Shadow of the Holy Book (2007) Documentary
A Man's Work  (2007) 
Revolution  (2006) Documentary
Frozen City  (2006) 
Frozen Land  (2005) 
Flowers and Binding  (2004) 
Young Gods  (2003) 
Irtiottoja (2003) TV Series
Juulia's Truths  (2002) (mini) TV Series 
The Free Fall  (10 episodes, 2002) TV Series
Lovers and Leavers  (2002) 
Restless  (2000)

References

External links
 

1971 births
Finnish film editors
Living people